Sauna may refer to:
Sauna, a small room or house designed as a place to experience dry or wet heat sessions
Finnish sauna
Infrared sauna
Gay sauna
A term used for a type of brothel
Sauna Open Air Metal Festival, music festival in Finland
Sauna (film), Finnish horror film of 2008
Sauna (album), 2015 album by musical artist Mount Eerie